Zoltán Farkas (born 7 October 1989 in Marcali) is a Hungarian football player who last played for Kozármisleny SE.

References
Player profile at HLSZ 

1989 births
Living people
People from Marcali
Hungarian footballers
Association football midfielders
Kaposvári Rákóczi FC players
Vasas SC players
Szeged-Csanád Grosics Akadémia footballers
Kozármisleny SE footballers
Nemzeti Bajnokság I players
Sportspeople from Somogy County